Delayed Auditory Feedback (DAF), also called delayed sidetone, is a type of altered auditory feedback that consists of extending the time between speech and auditory perception. It can consist of a device that enables a user to speak into a microphone and then hear their voice in headphones a fraction of a second later. Some DAF devices are hardware; DAF computer software is also available. Most delays that produce a noticeable effect are between 50-200 milliseconds (ms). DAF usage (with a 175 ms delay) has been shown to induce mental stress.

It is a type of altered auditory feedback that—along with frequency-altered feedback and white noise masking—is used to treat stuttering; it has also demonstrated interesting discoveries about the auditory feedback system when used with non-stuttering individuals. It is most effective when used in both ears.
Delayed auditory feedback devices are used in speech perception experiments in order to demonstrate the importance of auditory feedback in speech perception as well as in speech production.

There are now also different mobile apps available that use DAF in phone calls.

Effects in people who stutter

Electronic fluency devices use delayed auditory feedback and have been used as a technique to aid with stuttering. Early investigators suggested and have continually been proven correct in assuming  that those who stutter had an abnormal speech–auditory feedback loop that was corrected or bypassed while speaking under DAF. In people who stutter with atypical auditory anatomy, DAF improves fluency, but not in those with typical anatomy. DAF is also used with people who clutter. Its effects are slowing of speech which can result in increased fluency for people who clutter and also syllable awareness.

Effects in people who do not stutter

Studies that are more recent have looked at the effects of DAF in people who do not stutter to see what it can prove about the structure of the auditory and verbal pathways in the brain.

Indirect effects of delayed auditory feedback in people who do not stutter include a reduction in the rate of speech, an increase in intensity, and an increase in fundamental frequency that occur to overcome the effects of the feedback. Direct effects include the repetition of syllables, mispronunciations, omissions, and omitted word endings. These direct effects are often referred to as “artificial stuttering."

With an individual who does not stutter, auditory feedback speech sounds are directed to the inner ear with a 0.001 second delay. In delayed auditory feedback, the delay is artificially disrupted.

Studies have found that in children ages 4–6 there is less disturbance of speech than in children ages 7–9 under a delay of 200 ms. Younger children are maximally disrupted around 500 ms while older children around 400 ms. A 200 ms delay produces maximum disruption for adults. As the data collected from these studies indicate, the delay required for maximum  disruption decreases with age.  However, it increases again for older adults, to 400 ms.

Sex differences in DAF show no difference or indicate that men are generally more affected than women, indicating that the feedback subsystems in the vocal monitor process could be different between the sexes.

In general, more rapid, fluent speakers are less affected by DAF than slower, less fluent speakers. Also, more rapid fluent speakers are maximally disrupted by a shorter delay time, while slower speakers are maximally disrupted under longer delay times.

Studies using computational modeling and functional magnetic resonance imaging (fMRI) have shown that the temporo-parietal regions function as a conscious self-monitoring system to support an automatic speech production system and that projections from auditory error cells in the posterior superior temporal cortex that go to motor correction cells in right frontal cortex mediate auditory feedback control of speech.

Effects in non-humans

Continuous delayed auditory feedback in Zebra finch songbirds caused them to change their song syllable timing, indicating that DAF can change the motor program of syllable timing generation during short periods of time in zebra finches, similar to the effects observed in humans.

References

 
 

Sound
Anti-stuttering devices